The final tournament of the 1938 FIFA World Cup was a single-elimination tournament involving the 16 teams which qualified for the tournament. The tournament began with the round of 16 on 4 June and concluded with the final on 19 June 1938. Italy won the final 4–2 for their second World Cup title.

All times are in Western European Summer Time (UTC+01).

Bracket

Round of 16

Switzerland vs Germany
Switzerland adopted a precursor version of the Catenaccio system to try stopping the talented German forwards. Thanks to this tactical system, the Swiss managed to frustrate the Germans despite going behind after a goal from Gauchel. Switzerland drew level with Abegglen after a mistake from Willibald Schmaus. Although the Germans pushed for the win, the game ended with a draw, forcing a replay.

Hungary vs Dutch East Indies
The difference in strength between the two teams was evident as the game resulted in a humiliation for the Dutch East Indies, which managed to hold out for just 13 minutes. In the second half, although Hungary relaxed their pressure, they were never truly troubled by the opponents.

Sweden vs Austria

Cuba vs Romania
Cuba, who had only qualified because other Latin American selections had withdrawn, impressed against Romania. Romania scored first thanks to a goal that different sources attribute to either Silviu Bindea or Nicolae Kovács. Cuba drew level with Héctor Socorro, who converted a cross from José Magriñá and then took the lead with a goal from Magriñá himself. However, an equaliser from Iuliu Baratky forced a replay.

France vs Belgium
The hosts took the lead with only 35 seconds on the clock thanks to a shot from close range by winger Émile Veinante. France doubled their advantage soon after, but the lead was halved before the interval thanks to Hendrik Isemborghs, who connects with a free kick from Bernard Voorhoof. In the second half, Jean Nicolas got his brace, sealing the victory for France.

Italy vs Norway
Mindful of the game played against Norway at the semi-finals of the 1936 Summer Olympics, when Italy managed to scrap a win only during extra time, Vittorio Pozzo was not to be overconfident. Italy managed to grab an early lead with Pietro Ferraris, but struggle to threaten Norway's goal further besides hitting the post once. In the second half, Norway was the better team, hitting the woodwork thrice and finally drawing level in the 83rd minute. Soon inside the extra time, Silvio Piola converted in goal a rebounded shot. Italy managed to hold out for the remaining time, reaching the quarter-finals.

Brazil vs Poland

{| style="width:100%; font-size:90%;"
|
Assistant referees:
Louis Poissant (France)
Ernest Kissenberger (France)
|}|style="width:60%; vertical-align:top;"|
Match rules
90 minutes.
30 minutes of extra time if necessary.
Replay on a later date if scores still level.
No substitutions.
|}

Czechoslovakia vs Netherlands
Finalist at the 1934 World Cup, Czechoslovakia faced a modest Dutch team. Czechoslovakia dominated the ball but did not manage to convert their possession into clear-cut chances against a defensively sound Dutch team. In fact, Czechoslovakia managed to take the lead only in extra-time through a long-range effort, scoring a further two goals by the end of the game.

Replay: Switzerland vs Germany
The replay was played 5 days later. Switzerland used the same line-ups as the first game, while Germany made a few changes. Paul Aeby got injured after a few minutes, forcing Switzerland to play with 10 men. Germany took soon advantage, scoring twice. However, Switzerland reacted well, and with Aeby back on the pitch in the second half, completed a remarkable comeback.

Replay: Cuba vs Romania
The performance of Cuba's replacement goalkeeeper Juan Ayra was equally exceptional as the one from Benito Carvajales in the original match. Romania took the lead with Ștefan Dobay in the first half, but Cuba fought back and scored two goals in rapid succession soon after the beginning of the second and managed to hold on to the score against all odds and reach the quarter-finals.

Quarter-finals

Hungary vs Switzerland
Hungary looked like the stronger team as the Swiss were missing key players such as Georges Aeby and Severino Minelli. Hungary took the lead with a header from György Sárosi. The result was in doubt for most of the second half, until Gyula Zsengellér sealed the game with a long-range effort in the dying minutes. Switzerland's manager Karl Rappan resigned after the game.

Sweden vs Cuba
The result was never in doubt as Sweden was more accustomed to playing at this level. Gustav Wetterström netted a hat-trick before half-time, with the Cubans unable to deal with the relentless Swedish forward play, especially after Joaquín Arias was forced to leave the pitch injured. Tomás Fernández missed a penalty for Cuba.

Italy vs France
Title-holders Italy met hosts France in what was considered one of the most enticing games of the tournament. Italy wore their Fascist affiliated black shirts despite the anti-Fascism protests that the team had received in France. Italy had a better start, scoring within the first nine minutes, but France levelled immediately. In the second half, France tried to control the ball but, in doing so, they left themselves open for the lethal Italian counter-attack. Silvio Piola scored a brace while unmarked, leading Italy to the semi-finals.

Brazil vs Czechoslovakia

Replay: Brazil vs Czechoslovakia
Because of the troubling effect of the first game, which saw several players getting injured or sent off, both teams had to make many changes to their line-ups (nine for Brazil and five for Czechoslovakia). Czechoslovakia took the lead with Vlastimil Kopecký in the 25th minute, but in the second half, stand-in captain Leônidas levelled the score for Brazil. Soon after, the referee disallowed a goal by Karel Senecký, despite the Czechoslovak players stating that it had crossed the line. The European representative continued to attack following that moment, leaving space for the Brazilians to swiftly counter, which debutant Roberto took advantage of to score his nation's second goal.

Semi-finals

Hungary vs Sweden
Sweden took the lead after just 35 seconds, but that remained the only goal scored by them. Hungary quickly settled in control of the game, scoring thrice before half-time. Sweden, who had impressed in previous games, could not resist the vastly superior opponent, who scored two additional goals in the second half, cruising towards the final after a comfortable win.

Italy vs Brazil
The narrative leading to this highly anticipated match was built around an overconfident Brazil, who had impressed in the previous three matches. However, Italy had a better start to the game, creating the best chances but finding a well-positioned Walter stopping their attacks. In the second half, Italy soon found the net with Colaussi, before being awarded a penalty following a foul in the box by Domingos da Guia, his third in the tournament. The penalty was calmly converted by Meazza. At 2–0, Brazil pushed forward to break the Italian defence, but only managed to score a goal in the 87th minute with Romeu scoring from a corner kick. Some tense moments followed, but Italy managed to hold out for the remaining time, reaching their second final in a row.

Third place play-off
Sweden started on the front foot, taking a double lead inside 38 minutes. In the first half, Brazil looked uninspired until they got one back before half-time. In the second half, Brazil was reinvigorated and pushed for the comeback. In the second half, Leônidas scored twice and even let Patesko kick a penalty that he missed. Perácio secured the victory in the 80th minute.

Final

Footnotes

References

External links
1938 FIFA World Cup at FIFA.com

Final tournament
1938
FIFA World Cup 1938
Knockout stage
Knockout stage
Knockout stage
Knockout stage
Knockout stage
Knockout stage
Knockout stage
Knockout stage
Knockout stage
Knockout stage
Knockout stage
Knockout stage
Knockout stage
Knockout stage
Knockout stage